Mbeku  (from the Igbo word for tortoise) is the trickster tortoise in Igbo and West African folktales.

Tales
In one aetiological tale Mbekwu gets taken by the birds to a feast in the sky.  When he eats all the food, the birds stop him from flying back to the earth, and he falls, which is how the tortoises got the patterns on their shells.

In an Igbo fable Mbekwu (or Mbe) persuades Grasshopper (Ukpana) to help fake sadness on the death of his father-in-law, so that he can get food from his kinsmen, but breaks his pledge to share the food.  The grasshopper betrays him to his kinsfolk, who kill him.

Bibliography
 The Flying Tortoise,  Tololwa M. Mollel, illustrated by Barbara Spurll, Toronto, Oxford University Press, 1994, .
  Anthropological report on the Ibo-speaking peoples of Nigeria. Northcote W Thomas, 1913, London, Harrison

See also
 Àjàpá the Yoruba tortoise trickster

References

African fairy tales
African folklore
African mythology
Fables
Folklore characters
Oral tradition
Storytelling
Mythological tricksters
Igbo culture
Legendary turtles